The most widely reported UFO incident in New Zealand, and the only one investigated, involved the Kaikoura lights encountered by aircraft, filmed and tracked by radar in December 1978. The New Zealand Defence Force does not take an official interest in UFO reports, but in December 2010  it released  files on hundreds of purported UFO reports. New Zealand's then-Minister of Defence, Wayne Mapp said at the time people could "make what they will" of the reports, and said "a quick scan of the files indicates that virtually everything has a natural explanation".

1950s
In 1955 the captain of a National Airways Corporation aircraft reported seeing a light that showed apparent movement and changes in colour and intensity. The Director of Intelligence at the Carter Observatory concluded that it was Venus as it rose in the night sky.
A Blenheim farmer claimed to have seen lights and a UFO containing two men in silvery suits in the early morning of 13 July 1959.

1970s

The 21 December 1978 incident in the Kaikoura area attracted media attention throughout New Zealand and Australia. The crew of a cargo plane reported strange lights over the Kaikoura Ranges and a Wellington radar team reported inexplicable readings. These were filmed by a news crew over several nights.

2010s
On April 12, 2011, a family in Hāwera observed a fireball-like UFO at 8:55 PM, capturing the incident on camera. One witness stated it resembled a pyramid shape with a round top, later on it appeared to "cool down" with a red ring resembling a heating element. A week prior, a member of the Hawera Observatory and Astronomical Society observed a similar incident a week prior. A local dairy worker reported a similar sighting in the area during January 17 of the same year.
In June 2016, a spherical UFO was caught on camera near the city of Christchurch which rapidly changed colours and sped away after two hours. Two sightings of the object occurred, with both being captured on camera, the changes in color appeared to be coordinated in the second sighting, which involved two objects. 
On 31 March 2019, a couple spotted two lights hovering 200 metres above the water in Karekare Beach in Western Auckland. One of the two objects reported changed colour and quickly flew away. The couple later spotted 5 others displaying erratic flight patterns and changing their color.

2020s
A woman residing in Porirua witnessed three objects hovering over the city in the morning of August 3, 2020. She captured the objects on film and shared them on a local Facebook group, where another resident commented he saw the same objects.

See also
Bruce Cathie, a New Zealand author who has written about flying saucers
 UFO sightings in Australia

References

Further reading

External links
Ian Porritt UFO UAP Researcher
UFOCUS NZ
New Zealand sightings at UFOINFO
Original files: New Zealands's UFO sightings

New Zealand
Historical events in New Zealand
UFO
Lists of events in New Zealand